Michael Moynihan may refer to:

Michael C. Moynihan, American journalist, also writing for Swedish-language publications
Michael J. Moynihan (born 1969), American writer and musician
Michael Moynihan (author), American writer known for The Coming American Renaissance
Michael Moynihan (Cork politician) (born 1968), Irish Fianna Fáil Party politician and TD for Cork North-West
Michael Moynihan (Kerry politician) (1917–2001), former Irish Labour Party TD for Kerry South
Michael W. Moynihan (c. 1928–1996), American proponent of free trade